El Mundo Es de los Dos is the sixth studio album in the Spanish language album by Brazilian singer,  TV host and actress Xuxa. It was released on June 22, 1999 in Argentina, then in the United States and Mexico by PolyGram.

Production 
The album was produced by Francesc Pellicer and co-produced by Elio de Mallorca and Richard Roman. Graphic design is to Carmo Valerio. It was recorded at Studios Code. El Mundo és de los Dos the last work directed to the Hispanic teenage public of the singer. The lyrics of the songs present a more mature Xuxa, but without losing the youthful touch that characterizes it. She would only record another international album six years later, when she released Solamente para Bajitos (2005), the only Só Para Baixinhos recorded in Spanish language. This album closed the adolescent stage of Xuxa abroad. It was the last album of the presenter in the language to be released in cassette format.

Release 
It was released on June 22, 1999 in Argentina, then in the United States and Mexico.  El Mundo és de los Dos became the last work directed to the Hispanic teenage audience the singer.

Promotion 
In Mexico, Xuxa was invited by Televisa network to perform at the "Festival Acapulco Milenio", released his album.

Track list

Personnel

Photos: André Schilliró
Stylist: Willis Ribeiro
Makeup Department: Roberto Fernandes
Chorus: Susana Ribalta and Elio de Palma
Co-production: Elio de Palma, Richard Roman
Mastering: Jesus N. Gómez, on the CD Master
Production: Francesc Pellicer
Graphic design: Valério do Carmo
Direction of vocals and backing vocals: Graciela Carballo
Musical arrangements and programming: Elio de Palma (except "Mi niña bonita" by Marco Rasa)
Vocals recorded on: AR Stúdios
Voice recording engineer: Marcelo Saboia
Voice Recording Assistant: Doubt
Recorded and mixed on: Code Studios
Recording Engineers: Elio de Palma, Santi Maspons and Mard Martin

Release history

References

External links 
 El Mundo és de los Dos at Discogs

1999 albums
Xuxa albums
Spanish-language albums
Dance-pop albums by Brazilian artists